Ya'qub ibn Ishaq al-Tamimi was a naval commander in Fatimid service who led a major raid against the Italian coasts, Sardinia and Corsica in 934–935.

Naval expedition
Ya'qub was dispatched by Caliph al-Qa'im with a fleet of 20 vessels (according to the 15th-century Isma'ili historian Imadaddin Idris; Sunni sources report 30 ships) on 22 June 934 from al-Mahdiyya. Sailing from a western direction, he encountered some Christian merchant vessels, which he plundered and whose crews he took captive. The Fatimid fleet then captured Genoa by assault and plundered the city. During his return journey, he was attacked by Byzantine ships who had mobilized on the news of the sack of Genoa, but defeated them. He also raided Sardinia and Corsica before returning in triumph to al-Mahdiyya with some 8,000 prisoners.

Imadaddin places his return on 29 August 935, while there is some confusion on the expedition's dating in the Sunni sources—Ibn al-Athir reports two expeditions on consecutive years, the Cambridge Chronicle, Ibn Idari, al-Nuwayri, and Abu'l-Fida all place the expedition in 935, and Ibn Khaldun reports that the expedition was sent by al-Qa'im's predecessor, al-Mahdi. Imadaddin's account is generally considered the most accurate.

Family
His brother Khalil was a senior commander in Fatimid service, in charge of the Arab jund of Kairouan from at least 913 to his death in 944.

References

Sources
 
 
 

10th-century Arabs
10th-century people from the Fatimid Caliphate
Admirals of the Fatimid Caliphate
Fatimid people of the Arab–Byzantine wars
History of Genoa
Banu Tamim